Earl Coleman may refer to:

 Earl Thomas Coleman (born 1943), U.S. congressman
 Earl Coleman (singer) (1925–1995), jazz singer